The Auburn Tigers men's basketball program is the intercollegiate men's basketball team that represents Auburn University. The school competes in the Southeastern Conference in Division I of the National Collegiate Athletic Association (NCAA). The Tigers play their home games at Neville Arena in Auburn, Alabama on the university campus. The program began in 1906, and is currently coached by Bruce Pearl.

Auburn has won five conference regular season championships and two SEC tournament championships. Auburn has appeared in the NCAA tournament 12 times, making it as far as the Final Four in 2019. 
13 Auburn players have been named All-Americans and Auburn has had 98 All-SEC selections. Auburn has produced 35 NBA draft picks, including Jabari Smith (2022), who was selected with the third overall pick, the highest in Auburn history. Two Auburn players have been named SEC Player of the Year: Charles Barkley in 1984 and Chris Porter in 1999. Auburn has had six head coaches selected as SEC Coach of the Year a total of eight times, and former Auburn head coach Cliff Ellis was named National Coach of the Year by multiple outlets in 1999. Former Auburn player Charles Barkley was inducted into the Naismith Memorial Basketball Hall of Fame in 2006.

Coaches 
Auburn has had 20 head men's basketball coaches since the program was started in 1906 by Mike Donahue. The program is currently coached by Bruce Pearl.

Notable former coaches

Mike Donahue 
Mike "Iron Mike" Donahue was Auburn's first head men's basketball coach, starting the program in 1906. He coached the program for 16 seasons, the longest tenure of any men's basketball coach in Auburn history, finishing with a record of 74–80–1  (.481). In addition to coaching basketball, Donahue served as athletic director and coached the football, baseball, track, and soccer teams while at Auburn.

Ralph "Shug" Jordan 
Prior to his tenure as Auburn's head football coach, Ralph "Shug" Jordan coached the Auburn men's basketball program for 10 seasons. Jordan was a football assistant coach when he coached the men's basketball program.

After playing football and basketball for Auburn from 1929 to 1932, Jordan became the head men's basketball coach in 1933. He coached until 1942, when he was called overseas to fight as an officer in World War II. Following his service, Jordan returned to Auburn to coach the 1945–46 team. He left Auburn to become the head men's basketball coach at Georgia after the season. Jordan finished with a record of 95–77 (.552) at Auburn.

Joel Eaves 
Joel Eaves was Auburn's 12th head men's basketball coach, coaching from 1949 to 1963. Eaves was a former Auburn football and basketball player, playing from 1934 to 1937 under head coach "Shug" Jordan.

Auburn won its first ever SEC championship under Eaves in 1960, finishing 12–2 in the conference and 19–3 overall. Eaves was named SEC Coach of the Year following the 1960 season. Eaves finished with a 213–100 (.681) record at Auburn, making him the winningest men's basketball coach in Auburn history.

Joel Eaves was inducted into the Alabama Sports Hall of Fame in 1978. Auburn's Memorial Coliseum was renamed after Eaves to Joel H. Eaves Memorial Coliseum in 1987, and later to Beard-Eaves-Memorial Coliseum in 1993.

Sonny Smith

Sonny Smith was the 15th head men's basketball coach at Auburn, coaching for 11 seasons from 1978 to 1989.

Smith coached Auburn to the NCAA tournament in 5 consecutive seasons, 1984 to 1988, including a run to the Elite Eight in 1986 before losing to eventual national champion Louisville. In addition to leading Auburn to its first ever NCAA tournament in 1984, he also coached Auburn to its first SEC tournament championship in 1985. Smith is the only head men's basketball coach in Auburn history to coach three consecutive 20-win seasons, doing so from 1984 to 1986. Sonny Smith was named SEC Coach of the Year in 1984 and 1988.

Smith coached his final season at Auburn in 1989, leaving to become the head men's basketball coach at VCU. Smith finished with a record of 173–154 (.529). Smith was inducted into the Alabama Sports Hall of Fame in 2007.

Cliff Ellis
Cliff Ellis was the 17th head men's basketball coach at Auburn. He coached for 10 seasons from 1994 to 2004.

Ellis had some success early in his career, leading Auburn to the NIT three times in his first four seasons and being named SEC Coach of the Year in 1995. His most successful season at Auburn was the 1998–99 season, where he led the Tigers to an SEC regular season championship and the program's first ever #1 seed in the NCAA tournament, in which they reached the Sweet Sixteen. Ellis was named both SEC and National Coach of the Year in 1999. Ellis would take Auburn to the NCAA tournament two more times: reaching the Second Round in 2000 and returning to the Sweet Sixteen in 2003.

Ellis was released following the 2003–04 season after finishing the season with a 14–14 record. Auburn faced NCAA sanctions over alleged recruiting violations during the season, but Ellis was not found at fault after the investigation. Ellis finished with a record of 186–125 (.598) at Auburn, trailing only Eaves on the school's all-time wins list.

Bruce Pearl 
Bruce Pearl became Auburn's 20th head men's basketball coach on March 18, 2014. He led Auburn to its third SEC regular season championship in the 2017–18 season and its second SEC tournament championship in 2019, en route to leading Auburn to its first ever Final Four in the 2019 NCAA tournament. Following another regular season championship in the 2021–22 season, Pearl was selected as SEC Coach of the Year.

Awards and honors 
National Coach of the Year
 Cliff Ellis (1999)
SEC Coach of the Year
 Joel Eaves (1960)
 Bob Davis (1975)
 Sonny Smith (1984, 1988)
 Tommy Joe Eagles (1990)
 Cliff Ellis (1995, 1999)
 Bruce Pearl (2022)
Alabama Sports Hall of Fame
 Joel Eaves (1978)
 Sonny Smith (2007)

Players

Awards and honors

Retired numbers

All-Americans

Other honors 
Naismith Memorial Basketball Hall of Fame
 Charles Barkley (2006)
USBWA National Freshman of the Year

 Jabari Smith (2022)

NABC Freshman of the Year

 Jabari Smith (2022)

Naismith Defensive Player of the Year

 Walker Kessler (2022)

NABC Defensive Player of the Year

 Walker Kessler (2022)

SEC Player of the Year
 Charles Barkley (1984)
 Chris Porter (1999)
SEC Tournament MVP
 Charles Barkley (1984)
 Chuck Person (1985)
 Bryce Brown (2019)
SEC Freshman of the Year
 Jabari Smith (2022)
SEC Rookie of the Year
 Chris Porter (1999)
SEC Defensive Player of the Year
 Walker Kessler (2022)
Alabama Sports Hall of Fame
 John Mengelt (1995)
 Charles Barkley (2001)
 Rex Frederick (2003)
 Chuck Person (2005)
USBWA Most Courageous Award
 Wes Flanigan (1997)

Auburn in the NBA

NBA Draft picks 
Auburn has produced 35 NBA draft picks, including 10 first round picks. The most players selected from Auburn in a single draft was 3 in the 1988 draft. Jabari Smith holds the record for the highest draft pick from Auburn, selected 3rd overall in the 2022 draft.

Auburn has had 5 players that transferred to another school before being selected in the NBA draft.

Undrafted free agents 
In addition to its 30 NBA draft picks, Auburn has produced several undrafted free agents that went on to have NBA careers.
 Myles Patrick (1980–1981)
 Aaron Swinson (1994)
 Adam Harrington (2002–2003)
 Pat Burke (2002–2003, 2005–2007)
 Marquis Daniels (2003–2013)
 Jared Harper (2019–present)

Awards and honors 
League MVP
 Charles Barkley (1993)
Rookie of the Year
 Chuck Person (1987)
All-Stars
 Eddie Johnson (1980, 1981)
 Mike Mitchell (1981)
 Charles Barkley (1987, 1988, 1989, 1990, 1991, 1992, 1993, 1994, 1995, 1996, 1997)

Auburn in the Olympics

Championships and postseason

Conference regular season championships 
Auburn has won five regular season conference championships in its history: one Southern Conference championship in 1928 and four Southeastern Conference championships in 1960, 1999, 2018, and 2022. Auburn also won the SEC West Division championship in 1999.

SEC Tournament
Auburn has won the SEC tournament twice: in 1985 under coach Sonny Smith and again in 2019 under Bruce Pearl. The 1985 Auburn Tigers won the tournament after beating Alabama 53–49 in overtime. That 1985 Auburn team was the first ever to win four games in four days to win the SEC Tournament. 
In 2019, the Tigers earned a bye in the Tournament during the regular season and won games against Missouri, South Carolina, and Florida before crushing Tennessee in the final game 84–64. Auburn has reached the SEC Tournament final two other times: in 1984, where they lost to Kentucky 51–49, and in 2000, where they lost to Arkansas 75–67. Auburn has had three SEC Tournament MVPs: Charles Barkley in 1984, Chuck Person in 1985, and Bryce Brown in 2019.

NCAA tournament
Auburn has appeared in the NCAA tournament 12 times. Their combined record is 19–12.

NIT
Auburn has appeared in the National Invitation Tournament (NIT) 6 times. Their combined record is 4–6.

Facilities

Former facilities

Alumni Gymnasium 
Auburn's first on-campus basketball facility was Alumni Gymasium, which opened in February 1916. Auburn played its home games in Alumni Gymnasium until Auburn Sports Arena was opened in 1946.

Auburn Sports Arena 

Auburn Sports Arena was a 2,500 seat multi-purpose arena. Nicknamed "The Barn," it opened in 1946. It was replaced when Beard-Eaves-Memorial Coliseum opened in 1969. Auburn Sports Arena stood until September 21, 1996, when it caught fire and burned down in the middle of a football game between Auburn and LSU.

Beard–Eaves–Memorial Coliseum 

Beard–Eaves–Memorial Coliseum is a 10,500-seat multipurpose arena that opened in 1969 under the name Memorial Coliseum. It was renamed after former player and coach Joel Eaves to Joel H. Eaves Memorial Coliseum in 1987. It was renamed for the final time to Beard-Eaves-Memorial Coliseum in 1993, adding the name of former Auburn athletic director Jeff Beard.

Auburn boasted a 393–182 (.683) overall record at Beard–Eaves–Memorial Coliseum. Auburn had a winning record at home in 37 of the 42 seasons Auburn played in the Coliseum. Auburn's 30-game home winning streak from the 1997–98 season to the final game of the 1999–2000 season was the longest in Coliseum history. It was the nation's second longest current winning streak at the time and is the second longest home winning streak in Auburn history.

Auburn played its final season in Beard–Eaves–Memorial Coliseum in the 2009–10 season. Auburn's final game in Beard–Eaves–Memorial Coliseum was on March 3, 2010; Auburn beat Mississippi State 89–80.

Neville Arena 

On June 29, 2007, Auburn announced plans to build a new $92.5 million basketball arena and practice facilities that would eventually be completed for the 2010–11 season. The arena was initially named Auburn Arena, but later renamed to Neville Arena in 2022. With a seating capacity of 9,121, Neville Arena is the smallest men's basketball arena in the SEC. Aside from the main court, the arena also contains two practice courts, a weight room, 12 suites, coaches offices, the Auburn Ticket Office, and the Lovelace Athletic Museum.

Auburn played its first game in Auburn Arena on November 12, 2010, losing to UNC Asheville in overtime 70–69. Auburn's first win in Auburn Arena came on November 21, 2010, when Auburn beat Middle Tennessee 68–66. Auburn currently holds a  record in Neville Arena.

Traditions

Rivalries

Alabama 

Sometimes referred to as the "Iron Bowl of Basketball," Auburn and Alabama have a fierce rivalry that dates back to 1924. Auburn and Alabama first met in the Southern Conference Tournament on March 1, 1924, and Auburn lost 19–40. The two programs did not meet again until 1941 in the SEC tournament, a matchup that Auburn lost again 16–38. The programs have played regularly since 1948, meeting at least twice every season starting in 1949. Auburn's first win in the rivalry came in their sixth meeting on December 20, 1949, when Auburn beat Alabama 45–40.

Auburn and Alabama have met in the SEC Tournament 9 times, including Auburn's 53–49 overtime victory over Alabama in the 1985 SEC Tournament championship game. Alabama leads the all-time series 101–67.

Georgia 
Georgia is Auburn's oldest rival, first meeting in 1908 in Columbus, GA. Auburn won that game 34–20. Auburn and Georgia have played at least once every year since 1945. Auburn leads the all-time series 99–96.

UAB 

Though Auburn and UAB have met just 21 times, the two programs have a strong history. The first game between the two schools was played on November 26, 1982, a matchup won by Auburn, 63–61. The programs met 16 more times over the next two decades until the series was discontinued after the 1999–2000 season. In 2015, Auburn and UAB agreed to a four-game series that reignited the rivalry. Auburn leads the all-time series 11–10.

Student section 
Auburn's student section is known as The Jungle. Auburn held a vote to name their student section at the start of the 2011–12 season, and The Jungle was chosen from several options. Auburn officially started The Jungle on January 11, 2012 for the Auburn–Kentucky game. The Jungle was awarded the Sixth Man Award at the 2012 team banquet for its "outstanding support throughout the season and making Auburn Arena one of the loudest venues in the SEC."

The Auburn student section was previously known as Lebo's Lunatics during Jeff Lebo's tenure at Auburn and the Cliff Dwellers during Cliff Ellis' tenure.

References

External links